Taketo Gohara is a record producer and sound designer who has collaborated with numerous Italian artists and composers such as Vinicio Capossela, Brunori Sas, Elisa, Francesco Motta, Biagio Antonacci, Dardust, Remo Anzovino, Mauro Pagani, Vasco Brondi, Banda Osiris, Francesco Cerasi and Cesare Picco along with rock artists - Edda, Pier Paolo Capovilla, Lombroso, Marta Sui Tubi, Ministri, Mokadelic, Negramaro, Verdena, etc.

As a composer he has created various music for art installations, ballets and advertising over the years.

In the film industry he specializes as a sound designer and has more than 30 films to his credit as a soundtrack mixer in Surround

In an ambient and contemporary music setting, he has performed live with D. Rad (producer of Almamegretta) and Cesare Picco in various contemporary music and art festivals.

References

External links
Home page

Discography

Year of birth missing (living people)
Italian musicians
Living people
Italian people of Japanese descent